Kurlar may refer to:
 Kurlar, Ardabil (كورلار - Kūrlār)
 Kurlar, Golestan (كورلر - Kūrlar)